

Films

LGBT
1968 in LGBT history
1968
1968